Hinari Domestic Appliances or Hinari LP is a British manufacturer of domestic electrical products. Hinari was acquired by Alba plc in 1989.

The Hinari range 
'Hinari Ellipse' - Stainless steel products including jugs.
Hinari Lifestyle - Traditional white kitchen and coloured hand held appliances.
Hinari 'Body and Soul' range - A foot bath range.
Hinari ‘Café Continental’ - A range of coffee machine designed to prevent coffee from going cold.
Hinari ‘Sunrise’ TV - A TV with an alarm clock built in display and sleep timer with remote control.

Partnerships 
Hinari has recently produced an electrical product named 'Hinari Aqua-Flow made using Brita's water filteration design and Hinari's 'style'.
Hinari has also produced televisions along with Schneider.

Hinari is based at Elstree office along with Bush and Grundig UK.

See also 
Bush (company)
Alba

Home appliance manufacturers of the United Kingdom